Muscle Shoals Sound Studio is an American recording studio in Sheffield, Alabama, formed in 1969 by four session musicians known as The Muscle Shoals Rhythm Section. They had left nearby FAME Studios in Muscle Shoals to create their own recording facility.

They attracted noted artists from across the United States and Great Britain. Over the years, artists who recorded at Muscle Shoals Sound Studio included The Rolling Stones, Aretha Franklin, Duane Allman, George Michael, Wilson Pickett, Willie Nelson, Lynyrd Skynyrd, Joe Cocker, Levon Helm, Paul Simon, Bob Seger, Rod Stewart, Tamiko Jones, Cher and Cat Stevens.

History

Founders

The four founders of the studio, Barry Beckett, Roger Hawkins, Jimmy Johnson and David Hood, were session musicians at Rick Hall's FAME Studios; they were officially known as the Muscle Shoals Rhythm Section but widely referred to as "The Swampers," who were recognized as having crafted the "Muscle Shoals sound" in conjunction with Hall.

The Muscle Shoals Rhythm Section was the first group of musicians to own a studio and to eventually run their own publishing and production companies. They provided musical backing and arrangements for many recordings, including major hits by Wilson Pickett, Aretha Franklin, and the Staple Singers; a wide range of artists in popular music also recorded hit songs and complete albums at the studio. They had first worked together in 1967 and initially played sessions in New York and Nashville before doing so at FAME.  Their initial successes in soul and R&B led to more mainstream rock and pop performers who began coming to record at Muscle Shoals Sound Studios, including the Rolling Stones, Duane Allman, Traffic, Bob Seger, Elton John, Boz Scaggs, Willie Nelson, Paul Simon, Bob Dylan, Dr. Hook, Elkie Brooks, Millie Jackson, Julian Lennon, and Glenn Frey.

3614 Jackson Highway
The Muscle Shoals Rhythm Section partnered with Jerry Wexler, who provided start-up funding to found Muscle Shoals Sound Studio at 3614 Jackson Highway in Sheffield. The concrete block building, originally built around 1946, was previously a coffin showroom.

Cher's sixth album was titled 3614 Jackson Highway (1969) and this became the informal name for the studio in 1969.

The first hit to the studio's credit was R. B. Greaves' "Take a Letter Maria". By December 1969, the Rolling Stones were recording at this new location for three days.

1000 Alabama Avenue 

The studio at 3614 Jackson Highway closed in April 1979, relocating to a larger updated facility in Sheffield located at 1000 Alabama Avenue. This location operated until it was closed and sold in 1985 to Malaco Records, Tommy Couch's Jackson, Mississippi-based soul and blues label, which also bought the publishing rights held by the Muscle Shoals Sound. Malaco used the Sheffield studios for its own artists, including Johnnie Taylor, Bobby Bland and Little Milton, as while continuing to operate its own facility in Jackson. The Rhythm Section, minus Beckett, worked with other studio musicians at Malaco Records and at other studios. In 2005, Couch decided to close the Malaco studio on Alabama Avenue because he was having difficulty competing with more technologically advanced studios.

After the closure of the 1000 Alabama Avenue location, the building was taken over by a movie production company. In 2007, this location housed Cypress Moon Productions and the Cypress Moon Studio with functioning recording equipment, which was operating as a recording studio and was open for tours.

Recent history 
Although it was no longer a working studio in 2009 and 2010, the Jackson Highway location was rented for recording some or all of two Grammy-nominated albums. Band of Horses's third CD, Infinite Arms, recorded in part at that studio, was nominated for a Grammy Award in the category Best Alternative Album.

Ten tracks of Black Keys's sixth album, Brothers, were also recorded at 3614 Jackson Highway. The album was nominated for a 2011 Grammy Award for Best Alternative Music Album. Two songs from the album, "Tighten Up" and "Black Mud", were nominated for Grammys: "Tighten Up" for Best Rock Performance by a Duo or Group with Vocal and Best Rock Song and "Black Mud" for Best Rock Instrumental Performance. Rolling Stone magazine placed the album at number-2 on its list of the Best Albums of 2010 and "Everlasting Light" at number 11 on its list of the Best Singles of 2010. The album was also featured on Spin magazine's Top 40 Albums of 2010.

Chris Stapleton recorded his Grammy winning single, "Cold" at Muscle Shoals Sound Studio in December 2018 and received the Grammy in 2022 thus making the studio one that produces Grammy winning hit records once again.

Restoration and reopening 
The original studio building on Jackson Highway, which had become an audio visual retailer and then an appliance store until 1999, changed ownership, the subsequent owner completing some renovations and retaining the old recording equipment, allowing for tours of the property. The building was listed on the National Register of Historic Places in June 2006.

In 2013,  the documentary Muscle Shoals raised public interest in a major restoration of the studio, and in June that year, the owner sold the property (without the historic recording equipment) to the Muscle Shoals Music Foundation, an organization that had been formed earlier that year with the goal of establishing a music museum in the historic building. A large grant from Beats Electronics provided an essential $1 million. The state tourism director said that the 2013 Muscle Shoals film had significant influence. "The financial support from Beats is a direct result of their film." Additional donations were made by other groups and individuals.

The building closed when major restoration work began in September 2015, and reopened as a finished tourist attraction operated by the Muscle Shoals Music Foundation on January 9, 2017. The interior is reminiscent of the 1970s, with relevant recording equipment and paraphernalia. According to a journalist who was a recent visitor, the restored studio is impressive: "Muscle Shoals Sound's interior appears much as it did in its prime. ... Some guitars and amps. A Hammond organ, Wurlitzer electric piano and black baby grand. The control room with recording console and analog tape machine ...  There are isolation booths, for vocals, percussion and such..."

The Alabama Tourism Department named Muscle Shoals Sound Studio as the state's top attraction in 2017, even before the Jackson Highway studio reopened. Over 62,000 people from 50 countries and every state in the U.S. have visited since it opened for tours again in 2013.

The studio is a working recording studio at night. Dan Auerbach of the Black Keys recorded a solo project in March 2017. Grammy winning producer Dave Cobb of Nashville recorded rockers Rival Sons in April 2017. Actor Kiefer Sutherland recorded with Swamper David Hood in May 2017. In 2018, Bishop Gunn released the first recording from the studio after the restoration, "Shine" from their album, Natchez. Donnie Fritts released tunes recorded at the studio on his June album, in conjunction with John Paul White and Single Lock Records.

Documentary 
Filmmaker Greg Camalier premiered his documentary film Muscle Shoals at the Sundance Film Festival in January 2013. It is about Muscle Shoals sound, and features Rick Hall, FAME Studios, and the Muscle Shoals Rhythm Section (Swampers) who had founded the Muscle Shoals Sound Studios. The film includes interviews with Percy Sledge, Wilson Pickett, Aretha Franklin, Etta James, Mick Jagger, Keith Richards, Steve Winwood, Bono, Alicia Keys and many others.

Selected recordings

See also
 Mussel
 List of music museums

References

External links 
 Cher 3614 Jackson Highway Home Page
 Jimmy Johnson and David Hood on re-acquisition of 3614 Jackson Highway
 Muscle Shoals Sound Studios on Discogs
 Jimmy Johnson Interview - NAMM Oral History Library (2015)

National Register of Historic Places in Colbert County, Alabama
Recording studios in the United States
Bill Haley
Florence–Muscle Shoals metropolitan area
Buildings and structures in Alabama
Museums in Colbert County, Alabama
Music museums in Alabama
Proposed museums in the United States
Commercial buildings on the National Register of Historic Places in Alabama
Entertainment companies established in 1969
1969 establishments in Alabama